Thomas P. Murray (born January 20, 1969) is an American rower. He competed in the men's coxless four event at the 1996 Summer Olympics.

References

External links
 

1969 births
Living people
American male rowers
Olympic rowers of the United States
Rowers at the 1996 Summer Olympics
Rowers from Buffalo, New York
Pan American Games medalists in rowing
Pan American Games gold medalists for the United States
Pan American Games silver medalists for the United States
Rowers at the 1995 Pan American Games
Rowers at the 1999 Pan American Games
Medalists at the 1995 Pan American Games
Medalists at the 1999 Pan American Games
World Rowing Championships medalists for the United States